Moron is the name of a location and a king in the Book of Ether in the Book of Mormon. They are both connected with the Jaredite people.

Jaredite king

According to the Book of Mormon, Moron was a Jaredite king who lived during the 1st millennium B.C. in the Americas.

Genealogy

He was the son of Ethem, the grandson of Ahah, as well as being the father of Coriantor, and grandfather of Ether, after whom the Book of Ether is named. He was a descendant of Jared.

Character and reign
Moron is described as doing "that which was wicked before the Lord." He is the subject of several verses in Chapter 11 of the Book of Ether.

Moron succeeded Ethem as king, but during his reign, there was a "rebellion among the people, because of that secret combination which was built up to get power and gain" and the rebel leader took over half of Moron's kingdom. Moron was to regain the other half of his kingdom, but he was overthrown by a descendant of the Brother_of_Jared, and spent the rest of his days in captivity, where he fathered Coriantor.

Land of Moron
The Land of Moron is also mentioned in the Book of Ether, in chapters 7 and 14. The Land of Moron was near the Land of Desolation of the Nephites. It was here that Corihor captured the King Kib, and later in the chapter, we find that Noah captured Shule here. In Chapter 14, we find that Coriantumr fought Lib in the Land of Moron, and that the Brother of Shared placed himself on the throne of Coriantumr in the Land of Moron.

References

External links

 Years of the Jaredites

Book of Mormon people
Book of Mormon places